Kulyov is a Russian masculine surname, its feminine counterpart is Kulyova. Notable people with the surname include:

Vitali Kulyov (born 1976), Russian footballer

See also
Kulov

Russian-language surnames